Warner Bros. Discovery New Zealand is a subsidiary of Warner Bros. Discovery that operates several television channels in New Zealand. It operates five national free-to-air television channels, eight pay-TV channels on Sky and the Newshub service.

It was formerly known as MediaWorks TV and operated as a subsidiary of MediaWorks New Zealand between 2004 to 2020. In 2019, MediaWorks announced that they were selling their television operations. In September 2020, Discovery, Inc. purchased MediaWorks TV with the acquisition being finalized on 1 December 2020. The subsidiary was subsequently rebranded as Discovery New Zealand.

History 
Three was founded as TV3 in 1989 after the Fourth Labour government allowed for a private television broadcaster. CanWest obtained TV3 between 1991 and 1997 after the National government loosened rules on foreign ownership. Under CanWest control, TV3 relaunched in March 1998 with a new brand and a 3 News bulletin hosted by John Campbell and Carol Hirschfeld.

MediaWorks New Zealand (2004–2020) 
MediaWorks TV was created in 2004, and owned TV3 and C4. In 2005, Hilary Barry & Mike McRoberts became the station's news anchors. TV3 staff also launched youth station TV4 in 1997, and replaced it with C4 on October 3, 2003.

In 2009 the timeshift channel TV3 Plus 1 was launched. C4 2 was launched in 2010, then, when TV4 returned as FOUR taking over C4's Channel 4 position in early 2011, C4 converted C4 2 into a music show as it was moved to Freeview Channel 9. In 2014, timeshift channel Four Plus 1 was launched, and The Edge TV replaced C4.

In May 2016, MediaWorks and NBCUniversal Television Distribution entered into a joint venture and revamped FOUR as the new reality television channel Bravo. In August 2016, Michael Anderson was appointed as CEO of MediaWorks.

In 2017, TV3 was rebranded as Three. On 15 April 2018, MediaWorks launched ThreeLife, a lifestyle channel.

On 1 July 2019, The Edge TV moved exclusively online, and was replaced on TV by ThreeLife + 1.

On 18 October 2019, it was announced that MediaWorks was intending to sell off their television division including Three, ThreeLife, and Bravo. MediaWorks also intends to sell its Flower Street head office and studios in Auckland's Eden Terrace. Several Three television programs and shows have also been canceled. Media commentator Bill Ralston has claimed that hundreds of jobs could be lost if a buyer is not found.

ThreeLife and ThreeLife + 1 went off air on 26 March 2020. ThreeLife was replaced by The Edge TV. ThreeLife + 1 was replaced by a simulcast of The Breeze, then The Breeze TV on 16 April.

On 25 May 2020, MediaWorks CEO Michael Anderson announced that the company would be eliminating 130 jobs in its sales, out-of-home, and radio divisions as a result of the economic effects of the COVID-19 pandemic in New Zealand.

Discovery, Inc. (2020–2022) 

On 7 September 2020, MediaWorks confirmed that it would be selling its entire television arm including Three, Bravo, The Edge TV, The Breeze TV, streaming service ThreeNow, and current affairs service Newshub to Discovery, Inc. The acquisition of MediaWorks was finalised on 1 December 2020, with the subsidiary being rebranded as Discovery NZ Limited.

On 27 April 2021, Discovery Inc. confirmed that it would be restructuring its business operations in Australia and New Zealand with the goal of incorporating Three, Bravo and Newshub into a single trans-Tasman organisation. Earlier in the month, Discovery announced that this new trans-Tasman organisation would be headed by two general managers, the Sydney–based Rebecca Kent and Glen Kyne in Auckland. Discovery had also separately acquired New Zealand's TopTV operations in 2019.

On 13 May 2021, Newshub closed its Dunedin office as part of a restructuring of Discovery's business operations in Australia and New Zealand.  Following the closure of the Dunedin newsroom, the network's South Island operations will consist of its Christchurch–based bureau as well as freelancers.

On 10 November 2021, it was announced that Choice TV would be rebranded as Gusto in March 2022. However, shortly before launch the name Gusto was scrapped and changed to "eden" in order to avoid confusion with the former TVNZ OnDemand food channel of the same name. The rebranded channel will retain most of Choice's programming, with the major additions of Newshub Live at 8pm, an extension of Discovery New Zealand's news brand Newshub, and more drama programming. The channel will host British drama, game shows, and "intelligent" movies including Changing Rooms, Big Family Farm, Finding Alice, and a new local show called Great Southern Truckers.

A second channel called Rush will host "high energy shows" within the survival and adventure genres including Wheeler Dealers, Man vs. Wild, Street Outlaws and Treehouse Masters. Discovery also confirmed that its working on several local productions including MasterChef New Zealand, The Masked Singer NZ,  Dancing with the Stars, Match Fit, Patrick Gower: On series, David Lomas Investigates, and 7 Days. In addition, Discovery also announced plans to launch a new Newshub Live at 8pm bulletin and AM Early show in 2022.

Warner Bros. Discovery (2022–present)
On 8 April 2022, Discovery, Inc. acquired WarnerMedia from AT&T, with the two companies being merged into a new entity called  Warner Bros. Discovery. As a result, Discovery New Zealand and its assets Newshub and channel Three became part of the new media company.

As a result, Discovery New Zealand was rebranded as Warner Bros. Discovery New Zealand. On 20 April, World Rugby and Spark Sport announced that Warner Bros. Discovery NZ's channel Three would be the free-to-air broadcaster for the Rugby World Cup 2021, which New Zealand is scheduled to host between 8 October to 12 November 2022.

Ownership and brands

Services

Television 
Three, Bravo, Eden and Rush are operated out of Auckland. Television advertising was sold by the MediaWorks offices in Auckland, Wellington, Christchurch, Melbourne, Sydney and Hamilton. There were Newshub bureaus in the Three Headquarters in Auckland and MediaWorks offices in Wellington, Christchurch and Dunedin, with news staff working out of other offices as needed. Three provided mature content, Newshub bulletins, current affairs and sport. The Edge TV launched in 2014 and broadcasts music videos and entertainment news. All are available via all digital platforms such as terrestrial, satellite and cable. TV3 and Four were the only ones previously available via analogue terrestrial on the VHF band before the 2013 switch-off. The Edge TV was added in 2018. Bravo and Bravo Plus 1 replaced Four and Four Plus 1 in 2016. ThreeLife was added in 2018, and ThreeLife + 1 replaced The Edge TV on terrestrial in 2019. On 25 March 2020, ThreeLife went off air, and was replaced by The Edge TV, and its timeshift channel by Breeze TV. In 2022, The Edge TV and Breeze TV went off air to make way for the new Rush, Eden and Eden+1 (timeshift) channels.

Free-to-air television brands

Former free-to-air television brands

Current pay television brands

Former pay television brands

Newshub 

Newshub is a New Zealand news service that airs on TV channels Three and Eden and on digital platforms. The Newshub brand replaced 3 News service on the TV3 network and the Radio Live news service heard on MediaWorks Radio stations on 1 February 2016.

Websites

Defunct websites

See also 
 Freeview

References

External links 
 Discovery New Zealand

MediaWorks New Zealand
Mass media companies established in 2004
New Zealand companies established in 2004
Former Corus Entertainment subsidiaries
Warner Bros. Discovery Asia-Pacific
New Zealand subsidiaries of foreign companies
Companies based in Auckland